Carlos Marchena López (born 31 July 1979) is a Spanish retired footballer, and a manager. Mainly a central defender with an aggressive approach, he also played as a defensive midfielder.

Most of his professional career (nine years) was spent at Valencia, where he helped the club to five major titles, including two La Liga championships. He amassed totals in that competition of 330 matches and 11 goals over 13 seasons, also playing for Sevilla, Villarreal and Deportivo.

A Spanish international for the better part of the 2000s, Marchena won 69 caps and represented the national team in two World Cups and two European Championships, winning each competition once.

Club career

Early years
Born in Las Cabezas de San Juan, Province of Seville, Andalusia, Marchena started his professional career in hometown club Sevilla FC at the age of 18, when the club was playing in the second division. In the 1999–2000 season he made his La Liga debut, playing the entire match in a 2–2 home draw to Real Sociedad on 22 August 1999.

When Sevilla was relegated again at the end of the season, Marchena earned a transfer to Portugal's S.L. Benfica. During his spell in Lisbon he scored in two narrow wins, at home against C.F. Os Belenenses (1–0) and at S.C. Salgueiros (2–1), but almost left the club in late 2000 due to lack of payment.

Valencia
Marchena returned to his country in summer 2001 as he signed a four-year contract with Valencia CF which involved a swap-deal, with Zlatko Zahovič moving in the opposite direction. Having signed as a cover for ageing Miroslav Đukić, he took a while to impress in his first season (16 appearances) as Valencia clinched their first league title in 30 years, but gradually became first-choice.

In the 2003–04 campaign, with the club capturing an historic league and UEFA Cup double, Marchena played a pivotal role in defence, teaming up with Roberto Ayala. These performances led to his selection for the Spain national team for the Euro 2004 tournament.

2004–05 was not a very successful season for Valencia, as under new coach Claudio Ranieri the team struggled both domestically and in European tournaments. In a UEFA Champions League group stage match against SV Werder Bremen at the Weser-Stadion, Marchena was also given his marching orders in the early minutes of the second half (2–1 defeat) and his side were eventually eliminated from the elite competition; he remained a regular at both defensive positions.

During the Champions League match against Inter Milan on 6 March 2007, Marchena was involved in the on-pitch melee sparked by his teammate David Navarro: the former appeared to kick Inter defender Nicolás Burdisso after an angry exchange of words and, after the latter punched the Argentine's nose, a scuffle took place with several of Burdisso's teammates chasing Navarro all the way into the dressing room.

Consequently, Marchena, Navarro and several other Inter players involved were later charged with "gross unsporting conduct" by UEFA after the investigation. Both clubs were fined £106,000 while Marchena was banned for four games; after Euro 2008 he was selected by his teammates as new team captain, although he missed the first two months of the new season due to injury.

In the 2009–10 campaign, veteran Marchena contributed with 24 matches as the Che finished third and returned to the Champions League. He scored in two 3–1 away wins, against CA Osasuna and Xerez CD, only being booked seven times.

Late career

On 1 August 2010, 31-year-old Marchena signed with Villarreal CF for three years. He made his official debut for the Valencians 18 days later, opening the score in a 5–0 home win against FC Dnepr Mogilev for the campaign's Europa League.

Regularly used in both defensive positions again, Marchena scored his second goal for the Yellow Submarine on 7 April 2011, in the same competition, a 5–1 home rout of FC Twente in the quarter-finals' first leg. He left at the end of 2011–12 after being released from contract, and his team also suffered relegation.

In the 2012 off-season, Marchena initially joined Deportivo de La Coruña for one year. The Galicians were eventually relegated but he chose to remain for a further season, in spite of more lucrative offers.

Following Deportivo's return to the top flight in 2014, Marchena left the club and remained unemployed until 1 August 2015 when he signed for Indian Super League outfit Kerala Blasters FC as its marquee player. After missing the start of the season with injury, he made his debut on 18 October in a 0–1 home loss to Delhi Dynamos FC; on 4 November, he left due to personal reasons.

After a period of training with amateurs CD Gerena, Marchena announced his retirement in January 2016. On 7 June of the following year he returned to his first club Sevilla, being appointed assistant manager of the C-team.

International career
Marchena first appeared for Spain as part of the under-20 squad alongside Xavi and Iker Casillas, winning the 1999 FIFA World Youth Championship. He was also on the roster for the 2000 Summer Olympics squad, winning the silver medal.

Marchena made his senior team debut on 21 August 2002, playing in a testimonial match for Hungarian legend Ferenc Puskás in Budapest, just after the 2002 FIFA World Cup in South Korea and Japan. Subsequently, he was part of the nation's squads at UEFA Euro 2004, where he was chosen at the last minute by coach Iñaki Sáez as a strategic move to bolster his squad defensively; while Spain did not do well in the tournament and bowed out in the early stages, he did manage two appearances, although he also picked up two yellow cards while doing so.

On 8 June 2005, Marchena scored his first international goal, a last-minute equaliser in a 1–1 draw against Bosnia and Herzegovina for the 2006 World Cup qualifiers, played in Valencia. He was picked for the final squad, but only featured in the last group game against Saudi Arabia.

Marchena was selected again by Luis Aragonés for Euro 2008, this time as undisputed starter, having also featured prominently in the qualifying stages. With Joan Capdevila, Carles Puyol and Sergio Ramos, he formed a rock-solid defense and conceded only two goals in five games, his hard work and man-marking skills earning him a spot in the team of the tournament.

Under new coach Vicente del Bosque, Marchena slowly lost his spot to Gerard Piqué, but was still called up for the 2009 FIFA Confederations Cup and the 2010 World Cup. As Spain downed Saudi Arabia on 29 May 2010 in preparation for the latter competition (where he played six minutes in the 1–0 quarter-final win against Paraguay, adding two injury-time appearances), he played his 50th consecutive undefeated match with the national team, surpassing previous holder Garrincha (49).

In June 2018, Marchena was allowed by Sevilla to join newly appointed Fernando Hierro's coaching staff for the upcoming World Cup in Russia.

Career statistics

Club

International

Scores and results list Spain's goal tally first, score column indicates score after each Marchena goal.

Honours
Valencia
La Liga: 2001–02, 2003–04
Copa del Rey: 2007–08
UEFA Cup: 2003–04
UEFA Super Cup: 2004
Spain U20
FIFA World Youth Championship: 1999

Spain U23
Summer Olympic silver medal: 2000

Spain
FIFA World Cup: 2010
UEFA European Championship: 2008
FIFA Confederations Cup third place: 2009
Individual
UEFA Euro 2008: Team of the tournament

References

External links

 
 CiberChe stats and bio 
 
 

1979 births
Living people
People from Bajo Guadalquivir
Sportspeople from the Province of Seville
Spanish footballers
Footballers from Andalusia
Association football defenders
Association football midfielders
Association football utility players
La Liga players
Segunda División players
Segunda División B players
Sevilla FC players
Sevilla Atlético players
Valencia CF players
UEFA Cup winning players
Villarreal CF players
Deportivo de La Coruña players
Primeira Liga players
S.L. Benfica footballers
Indian Super League players
Indian Super League marquee players
Kerala Blasters FC players
Spain youth international footballers
Spain under-21 international footballers
Spain under-23 international footballers
Spain international footballers
2006 FIFA World Cup players
2010 FIFA World Cup players
FIFA World Cup-winning players
UEFA Euro 2004 players
UEFA Euro 2008 players
UEFA European Championship-winning players
2009 FIFA Confederations Cup players
Olympic footballers of Spain
Footballers at the 2000 Summer Olympics
Medalists at the 2000 Summer Olympics
Olympic silver medalists for Spain
Olympic medalists in football
Spanish expatriate footballers
Expatriate footballers in Portugal
Expatriate footballers in India
Spanish expatriate sportspeople in Portugal
Spanish expatriate sportspeople in India